ZTV is a cable television operator headquartered in Tsu, Mie Prefecture, Japan.

References

External links
 Z-WAVE (ZTV website)

Mass media companies of Japan
Cable television companies
Mass media in Tsu, Mie